The Real World: Hollywood is the twentieth season of MTV's reality television series The Real World, which focuses on a group of diverse strangers living together for several months in a different city each season, as cameras follow their lives and interpersonal relationships. It is the fifth season of The Real World to be filmed in the Pacific States region of the United States, specifically in California, after The Real World: San Diego.

The season features a total of nine cast members over the course of the season, as one cast member is evicted and replaced, and another is replaced after he voluntarily leaves the show. It is the only season to be set in the district of Hollywood and the second season to take place in a city that has hosted a previous season, as the show's second season was set in Los Angeles in 1993. This season also makes California the most commonly used state to be used as a setting for the series. Production started from August to December 2007. The season premiered on April 16, 2008 and consisted of 13 episodes.

Season changes
The previous nineteen seasons were aired as half-hour episodes. This season is the first to be aired as 13 one-hour episodes, a move that is credited as helping MTV rank as the #1 network in the Wednesday 10pm - 11pm time slot among people age 12-34. MTV continued with this format with the following seasons. MTV has also supplemented the airings with The Real World Dailies, an online series of unaired production footage launched in mid-April 2008 that, as of May 13, 2008, amassed 3 million hits by nearly 400,000 unique visitors.

A Real World: Hollywood marathon hosted by Coral Smith of The Real World: Back to New York was aired July 4, 2008. It featured commentary by Smith and other alumni of The Real World and Road Rules, referred to as "CoralVision".

MTV also aired The Sunny Side of Truth encore special, which features pop-up comments from characters from the Sunny Side of Truth, an anti-tobacco organization. Because a recurring theme of this season involves cast members talking about their struggles with drug and alcohol addiction, the comments often have a drug-abstinence message.

Assignment
Almost every season of The Real World, beginning with its fifth season, has included the assignment of a season-long group job or task to the housemates, continued participation in which has been mandatory to remain part of the cast since the Back to New York season. The Hollywood cast was assigned to take improv comedy classes at iO WEST, a comedy club in Hollywood. The cast names their group WTF, which ostensibly stands for Whiskey Tango Foxtrot, but subtextually stands for "What the Fuck", which cast member Dave Malinosky explains in Episode 8 is the reaction the cast predicted they would invoke in their audience.

The residence
The cast residence, Stage 20, was located at Columbia Square, in a seven-story,  building at 6121 West Sunset Boulevard at the intersection of North Gower Street in Gower Gulch, Los Angeles that formerly served as a CBS broadcast facility where programs such as I Love Lucy were filmed (Map). The building is part of a  complex that takes up an entire city block, which previously housed eight studios and CBS's local television and radio operations, including KCBS-TV/KCAL-TV, KNX Radio and KCBS-FM. The complex also included a 1,050 seat auditorium, a restaurant, and a bank. The northeast corner of the complex was used for filming. The property was purchased in August 2006 for $66 million USD by Molasky Pacific, LLC, who intend to redevelop it to attract other residential and office tenants.

According to MTV, this season of The Real World was the first to incorporate environmentally friendly household and lifestyle choices, including a solar-heated swimming pool that uses salt to reduce the need for chemical treatment, Energy Star appliances, bamboo flooring, recycled glass counters, some sustainable furniture, energy efficient lighting, a computer powered by an exercise bicycle, paperless toilets, a smart stove, an air conditioner system that provides water for an outdoor vegetable garden, a computer that tracks the amount of carbon saved by the housemates, and a hybrid car.

Cast
MTV revealed the cast on The Real World Awards Bash, which aired April 2, 2008. This is the first (and only) season in which a cast member was chosen by the fans via a multistage online poll from a pool of 20,000 applicants. The seventh cast member as voted by the fans was 20-year-old model Greg Halstead.

The majority of the cast members are entertainment industry types that could best take advantage of the Hollywood setting to forward their career goals. On December 5, 2007 the cast was filmed performing at iO WEST, which served as the season's workplace, orchestrating a sketch as the comedy troupe Whiskey Tango Foxtrot.

: Age at time of filming.

Duration of cast 

Notes

Episodes

After filming
The Real World: Hollywood Reunion special was held live in Times Square on July 12, 2008, and was hosted by Lyndsey Rodrigues. All cast members appeared except for Greg, whose absence was not explained, but was the source of speculation. (Greg later indicated in an interview that he was upset over his eviction from the show, and would never again participate in a Bunim-Murray production.) Among the topics of discussion were Greg's behavior, Will's reasons for his confrontation with Greg in Episode 7, the attack on Dave in the final episode, Sarah's outspokenness, the conflict between Kimberly and Brianna concerning Brianna's lifestyle, Joey's alcoholism, the portrayal of his roommates' responsiveness to his struggle to remain sober, Nick and Brittini's experiences as the replacement roommates, and the various romantic and sexual relationships among the cast. Among the relationships discussed were Dave and Kimberly, Joey and Brianna, Sarah's revelation that she was now engaged, the triangle between Will, Janelle and Brittini, and the subsequent foursome involving Will, Dave and two women. Present during the taping was Janelle herself, who took to the stage to air her criticisms of Will's behavior.

Death of Joey Kovar
In January 2010, Joey Kovar, spurred by the impending birth of his and his girlfriend's child, appeared on the third season of Celebrity Rehab with Dr. Drew, where he sought help for his addiction to cocaine, ecstasy and alcohol. After completing treatment, he indicated that after helping his girlfriend, Nikki, move into their new home, he would get a sponsor, go to meetings, and go to a sober living facility. A year after his girlfriend gave birth to their son, Kovar's daughter was born. On August 17, 2012, 29-year-old Kovar was found dead at a friend's home near Chicago. Autopsy results were inconclusive, and the cause of death was pending a toxicological test as of August 18, though police stated that no foul play was indicated, and Kovar's brother, David, denied that drugs were the cause, as he stated that Kovar was maintaining his sobriety. The cause of death was later to be known as an opiate intoxication.

The Challenge

Challenge in bold indicates that the contestant was a finalist on the Challenge.

Ratings
For the first four weeks, the season posted a 2.5 rating among people 12-34, a 14% increase from the prior season-to-date. The season also saw growth among females 18-24 with a 6.1 rating, a 39% increase over the previous year. The season made MTV the #1 network for the Wednesday 10pm - 11pm time slot among people 12-34, exceeding even broadcast networks for the same demographic. As of May 13, 2008, the season reached 44 million viewers, 23 million of which are in the network's 12-34 target demographic core.

References

External links
The Real World: Hollywood at mtv.com
Cast biography page at mtv.com
Where are they now? A rundown of the cast's activities following the taping of the season at mtv.com

Hollywood
Hollywood, Los Angeles
Television shows set in Los Angeles
2008 American television seasons
Television shows filmed in Los Angeles